Strelka is an urban locality (an urban-type settlement) under the administrative jurisdiction of the Town of Lesosibirsk in Krasnoyarsk Krai, Russia. Population: .

Administrative and municipal status
Within the framework of administrative divisions, it is, together with the urban-type settlement of Strelka and one rural locality (the settlement of Ust-Angarsk), incorporated as the krai town of Lesosibirsk—an administrative unit with the status equal to that of the districts. The urban-type settlement of Strelka and the rural locality of Ust-Angarsk is incorporated as Lesosibirsk Urban Okrug.

References

Notes

Sources

Urban-type settlements in Krasnoyarsk Krai
Lesosibirsk Urban Okrug
Populated places on the Yenisei River
Populated places established in 1647
1647 establishments in Russia